The National Industrial Basketball League was founded in 1947 to enable U.S. mill workers a chance to compete in basketball. The league was founded by the industrial teams (teams sponsored by the large companies and made up of their employees) belonging to the National Basketball League (NBL) that did not join the National Basketball Association when the NBL merged with the Basketball Association of America.

League history

The league first year, 1947–48, featured five teams in an eight-game schedule—the Milwaukee Harnischfeger's (which won the round robin schedule with an 8-0 record), Peoria Caterpillars, Milwaukee Allen-Bradleys, Akron Goodyear Wingfoots, and Fort Wayne General Electrics. The following season (1948-1949), with a 16-game schedule, the new lineup was league champion Bartlesville Phillips 66ers (15-1 record), Denver Chevvies, Peoria Caterpillars, Akron Goodyears/Akron Goodyear Wingfoots, and Milwaukee Allen-Bradleys.

In the 1949-50 season, with the addition of the Dayton Industrialists making the league a six-team circuit, the Phillips 66ers repeated as champions. The league expanded again in the 1950-51 season to eight teams, adding the (Oakland Blue 'n Gold Atlas) and San Francisco Stewart Chevrolets. The Dayton team renamed as the Dayton Air Gems, and the Phillips 66ers repeated for their third consecutive title.

High Point of League Expansion

The league in 1951-52 expanded to 11 teams, with such new teams as the Los Angeles Fibber McGee & Mollys, Artesia REA Travelers, and Santa Maria Golden Dukes. The Phillips 66ers just edged the Oakland Atlas-Pacific Engineers and the San Francisco Stewart Chevrolets for their fourth title, with a 17-5 record to their opponents 16-6 records that tied for second. The next season (1952-1953), the league dropped down to nine teams, but saw new opponents in the Houston Ada Oilers and the Los Angeles Kirby's Shoes. The Phillips 66ers edged the Peoria Caterpillars for the title by one game, with a 13-3 record.

The Peoria Cats tied the Phillips 66ers for the 1953-54 title, each with a 10-4 record. Charter member Milwaukee Allen Bradleys, which managed to stay in the league, took last place for the fifth year in seven years in the eight-team circuit. Those Milwaukee fans were supportive apparently. The next two seasons, the Phillips 66ers and the Peoria Cats took first and second respectively. A new team in the greatly reduced circuit of five teams in 1955-56 was the Wichita Vickers.  Milwaukee Allen-Bradley again took last place, their sixth time since the league began.

The 1956-57 season was one of the most competitive in the NIBL history, with the Phillips 66ers taking first with a 13-7 record, but tied for second were four teams with 11-9 records, among them new member the Denver-Chicago Truckers, headquartered in Denver. Milwaukee Allen-Bradley was typically the only non-competitive team, finishing last for the seventh time with a 3-17 record. This was the last season for the Milwaukee team, which had valiantly survived since the league's founding.

The 1957-58 season saw the Wichita Vickers move to the forefront, tying the Phillips 66ers for the league title, each with a 21-9 record. A new team that year was the Kansas City Kaycee's.

End of the Phillips 66ers Winning Streak

Finally, in the 1958-59 season, the Phillips 66ers showed they were mortal, and took a mediocre third-place. First was the Denver-Chicago Truckers, with a 21-9 record, and second the Wichita Vickers, with a 19-11 record. Joining the league that season was the Seattle Buchan Bakers.

Unhappily for the rest of the league, in the 1959-60 season, the Phillips 66ers were again on top.

Demise of the NIBL

The escalation in the salaries of the National Basketball Association had a serious impact on industrial basketball teams. When the salaries of NBA players and industrial league players were comparable in the 1950s, top-notch players saw little advantage to joining the pros. However, by the early 1960s, the industrial teams found that they could not compete with the pros salary-wise, as top college graduates increasingly gravitated to the NBA. The NIBL saw a decline in its program. The Peoria Cats, for example, disbanded at the end of the 1959-60 season.

In the NIBL's final season, 1960–61, the league had dropped down to only six members, and was divided into two divisions, Eastern (Cleveland Pipers, Akron Goodyears, New York Tuck Tapers) and Western (Denver-Chicago Truckers, Phillips 66ers, and Seattle Buchan Bakers). Instead of the round-robin schedule determining a winner, the league sponsored a four-team playoff. The Cleveland Pipers beat the Denver-Chicago Truckers for the championship, 136-100; and for third place, the Phillips 66ers beat the Akron Goodyears, 114-112.

In 1961 the league reorganized changing sponsorship from industrial companies and became the National Alliance of Basketball Leagues (NABL).  The Cleveland Pipers and the New York Tapers joined the newly formed American Basketball League in 1961.

The Bartlesville Phillips 66ers won the league championship in 11 of the league's 14 seasons.

The amateur nature of the NIBL
In the 1950s the salaries were about the same as the NBA and there was a job for all players in their companies. Some of them ended up being president of their companies, working there for a lifetime. Most of players wanted no part of the uncertain professional game, and instead were accepting a position with the companies, rejecting offers even from NBA.

The NIBL was dedicated to remaining amateur at a time when basketball was desperately trying to carve out some postwar space in the pro sports landscape. But professional basketball staggered forward and the NIBL flourished, mostly because its stability allowed companies to poach stars such as Bob Kurland.

The NIBL merged with other AAU leagues and reorganized into the National AAU Basketball League (NABL) in 1961.

Notable NIBL alumni

Basketball Hall of Fame alumni
 Don Barksdale (Oakland Blue 'n Gold Atlas) Inducted, 2012
 Bob Boozer (Peoria Caterpillars) Inducted, 2016
 Larry Brown (Akron Goodyears) Inducted, 2002
 Ace Gruenig (Denver Chevvies) Inducted, 1963
 Alex Hannum (Coach, Wichita Vickers) Inducted, 1998
 Gus Johnson (Cleveland Pipers) Inducted, 2010
 Bob Kurland (Bartlesville Phillips 66ers) Inducted, 1961
 Clyde Lovellette (Bartlesville Phillips 66ers) Inducted, 1988
 Hank Luisetti (Coach, Denver Chevvies & Coach, San Francisco Stewart Chevrolets) Inducted, 1959
 John McLendon (Coach, Cleveland Pipers) Inducted, 1979 and 2016
 George Yardley (San Francisco Stewart Chevrolets) Inducted, 1996

NIBL players who became NBA/ABA All-Stars
 Don Barksdale (Oakland Bittners|Oakland Blue 'n Gold Atlas)
 Dick Barnett (Cleveland Pipers)
 Vince Boryla (Denver Chevvies)
 Bob Boozer (Peoria Caterpillars)
 Larry Brown (Akron Goodyears)
 Gus Johnson (Cleveland Pipers)
 Clyde Lovellette (Bartlesville Phillips 66ers)
 Tom Meschery (San Francisco Stewart Chevrolets)
 Chuck Noble (Akron Goodyears)
 Don Ohl (Peoria Caterpillars)
 Lee Shaffer (Cleveland Pipers)
 Ben Warley (Cleveland Pipers)
 George Yardley (San Francisco Stewart Chevrolets)

NIBL Olympic Players and Coaches
 Don Barksdale (Oakland Blue 'n Gold Atlas) 1948 Olympic Team Gold Medal
 Lew Beck (Phillips 66ers) 1948 Olympic Team Gold Medal
 George Bon Salle  (Denver-Chicago Truckers) 1959 Pan American Games Gold Medal
 Ron Bontemps (Peoria Caterpillars) 1952 Olympic Team Gold Medal
 Bob Boozer (Peoria Caterpillars) 1959 Pan American Games Gold Medal, 1960 Olympic Team Gold Medal
 B.H. Born (Peoria Caterpillars) 1954 FIBA USA Team Gold Medal
 Dick Boushka (Wichita Vickers) 1956 Olympic Team Gold Medal
 Vince Boryla (Denver Chevvies) 1948 Olympic Team Gold Medal
 Larry Brown (Akron Goodyears) 1964 Olympic Team Gold Medal
 Omar Browning (Coach, Bartlesville Phillips 66ers), Head Coach, 1948 United States men's Olympic basketball team Gold Medal
 Gordon Carpenter (Phillips 66ers) 1948 Olympic Team Gold Medal
 Dick Davies (Akron Goodyears) 1964 Olympic Team Gold Medal
 Chuck Darling (Phillips 66ers) 1956 Olympic Team Gold Medal
 Marc Freiberger (Peoria Caterpillars & Houston Ada Oilers) 1952 Olympic Team Gold Medal
 Wayne Glasgow (Phillips 66ers) 1952 Olympic Team gold medal
 Don Goldstein (New York Tuck Tapers) 1959 Pan American Games Gold Medal
 Burdie Haldorson (Phillips 66ers) 1956 Olympic Team Gold Medal, 1960 Olympic Team Gold Medal
 Bill Hougland (Phillips 66ers) 1956 Olympic Team Gold Medal
 Robert Jeangerard (Phillips 66ers) 1956 Olympic Team Gold Medal
 Gene Johnson (Coach, Kansas City Kaycees & Seattle Buchan Bakers) Head Coach, 1936 United States men's Olympic basketball team Gold Medal
 Allen Kelley (Peoria Caterpillars) 1960 Olympic Team Gold Medal
 Bob Kurland (Phillips 66ers) 1948 Olympic Team Gold Medal, 1952 Olympic Team Gold Medal
 Lester Lane (Wichita Vickers) 1960 Olympic Team Gold Medal
 Clyde Lovellette (Phillips 66ers) 1956 Olympic Team Gold Medal
 Frank McCabe (Peoria Caterpillars) 1952 Olympic Team Gold Medal
 Pete McCaffrey (Akron Goodyears) 1964 Olympic Team Gold Medal
 Art Mollner (Coach, Los Angeles Fibber McGee and Mollys) 1936 Olympic Team Gold Medal
 Dan Pippin (Peoria Caterpillars) 1952 Olympic Team Gold Medal
 R. C. Pitts (Phillips 66ers) 1948 Olympic Team Gold Medal
 Jesse Renick (Phillips 66ers) 1948 Olympic Team Gold Medal
 Jerry Shipp (Phillips 66ers) 1964 Olympic Team Gold Medal
 Charlie Slack (Akron Goodyears) 1960 Olympic Team Gold Medal (alternate)
 Adrian Smith (Akron Goodyears) 1960 Olympic Team Gold Medal
 Johnny Stanich (Phillips 66ers, Denver Chevrolets, Denver Central Bankers) 1950 FIBA USA Team Silver Medal
 Dan Swartz (Wichita Vickers) 1959 Pan American Games Gold Medal
 Gary Thompson (Phillips 66ers) 1959 Pan American Games Gold Medal
 Ron Tomsic (San Francisco Stewart Chevrolets) 1956 Olympic Team Gold Medal
 Gerald Tucker (Phillips 66ers) 1956 Olympic Team Gold Medal
 Jim Walsh (Phillips 66ers) 1956 Team Olympic Gold Medal
 Howie Williams (Peoria Caterpillars)  1952 Olympic Gold Medal
 Warren Womble (Coach, Peoria Caterpillars) Head Coach, 1952 United States men's Olympic basketball team,  Gold Medal

Notable NIBL alumni
 Bud Adams (Owner, Houston Ada Oilers)
 Jim Ashmore (Denver-Chicago Truckers)
 Joe Belmont (Denver-Chicago Truckers)
 Al Bunge (Bartlesville Phillips 66ers)
 Art Bunte (Denver-Chicago Truckers)
 Bill Calhoun (Oakland Blue 'n Gold Atlas)
 Ken Charlton (Denver-Chicago Truckers)
 Gene Conley (Washington Tapers) 
 Johnny Cox (Cleveland Pipers), (Akron Goodyears)
 Howie Crittenden (Peoria Caterpillars)
 Johnny Dee (Coach, Denver-Chicago Truckers)
 Billy Donovan Sr. (Los Angeles Fibber McGee & Mollys)
 Chuck Hanger (Oakland Blue 'n Gold Atlas)
 Jerry Harper (Bartlesville Phillips 66ers), Houston Ada Oilers
 Swede Halbrook (Wichita Vickers)
 Phil Jordon (Seattle Buchan Bakers)
 George King (Bartlesville Phillips 66ers)
 Ron Livingstone (Oakland Blue 'n Gold Atlas)
 Bill Logan (Denver-Chicago Truckers) 
 Dave Minor (Denver Chevvies)
 Bill Morris (Coach, Buchan Bakers)
 Red Murrell (Bartlesville Phillips 66ers)
 Paul Neumann (New York Tuck Tapers)
 Jim Palmer (Dayton Industrials)
 Bobby Plump (Bartlesville Phillips 66ers), movie Hoosiers
 Ken Pryor (Bartlesville Phillips 66ers) 
 Terry Rand (Denver-Chicago Truckers)
 Hank Rosenstein (Coach, New York Tuck Tapers)
 Harv Schmidt (Denver-Chicago Truckers)
 Lloyd Sharrar (Cleveland Pipers, Akron Wingfoots)
 Arnold Short (Bartlesville Phillips 66ers)
 Glen Smith (Denver Central Bankers)
 George Steinbrenner (Owner, Cleveland Pipers)
 Jack Stone (Los Angeles Fibber McGee & Mollys)
 Stan Stutz (Coach, New York Tuck Tapers)
 Rolland Todd (Buchan Bakers)
 Bumper Tormohlen (Cleveland Pipers)
 Hank Vaughn (Coach, Akron Goodyears)
 Ed Voss (Oakland Blue 'n Gold Atlas) 
  Hoarce Walker (Denver-Chicago Truckers)
 Bus Whitehead (Bartlesville Phillips 66ers)
 Gene Wiley (Denver-Chicago Truckers)
 Andy Wolfe (San Francisco Stewart Chevrolets)

NIBL Teams 

 Akron Goodyear Wingfoots/Akron Goodyears (1947-1961)
 Bartlesville Phillips 66ers (1948-1961)
 Milwaukee Allen-Bradleys (1947-1957)
 Artesia CVE Travelers|Artesia REA Travelers (1951-1955)
 Cleveland Pipers (1959-1961)
 Dayton Air-Gems (1950-1952)
 Dayton Industrials (1949-1950)
 Denver Chevvies (1948-1951)
 Denver Central Bankers (1951-1955)
 Denver D-C Truckers (1956-1961)
 Fort Wayne General Electrics (1947-1948)
 Houston Ada Oilers (1952-1955)
 Kansas City Kaycees (1957-1958)
 Los Angeles Fibber McGee & Mollys (1951-1952)
 Los Angeles Kirby's Shoes (1952-1953)
 Milwaukee Harnischfegers (1947-1948)
 Peoria Caterpillars (1947-1960)
 New York Tuck Tapers (1959-1961)
 Oakland Blue 'n Gold Atlas (1950-1951)
 Oakland Atlas-Pacific Engineers (1951-1952)
 San Francisco Investors (1959-1960)
 San Francisco Stewart Chevrolets (1950-1952)
 Santa Maria Golden Dukes (1951-1954)
 Seattle Buchan Bakers (1958-1961)
 Wichita Vickers (1955-1960)

NIBL Champions

1947-48  Milwaukee Harnischfegers
1948-49  Bartlesville Phillips 66ers
1949-50  Bartlesville Phillips 66ers
1950-51  Bartlesville Phillips 66ers
1951-52  Bartlesville Phillips 66ers
1952-53  Bartlesville Phillips 66ers   
1953-54  Bartlesville Phillips 66ers and  Peoria Cats
1954-55  Bartlesville Phillips 66ers
1955-56  Bartlesville Phillips 66ers
1956-57  Bartlesville Phillips 66ers
1957-58  Phillips 66ers and  Wichita Vickers
1958-59  Denver-Chicago Truckers
1959-60  Bartlesville Phillips 66ers
1960-61  Cleveland Pipers

NIBL All-Star Game
1958, Peoria: East - West 113-104 
1959, Denver: East - West 81-78

Yearly NIBL Standings (1947-1948 to 1960-1961)

Teams profiles

References

External links 
 History of the Amateur Athletic Union
  http://www.dondennisfamily.com/D_C_Truckers/index.html

Defunct basketball leagues in the United States
Amateur Athletic Union